"Until the World Goes Cold" is a song by American heavy metal band Trivium, appearing on the band's seventh studio album, Silence in the Snow. The song was released as the album's third single on August 26, 2015.

Following its release, "Until the World Goes Cold" peaked at number 10 on the Billboard Mainstream Rock chart, Trivium's highest-charting single to date.

Reception
Vince Neilstein of Metal Sucks reacted positively to the song and noted its commercial potential. Neilstein called the song catchy and well-written, but criticized the use of auto-tune. In his review for Silence in the Snow, AllMusic reviewer Thom Jurek selected "Until the World Goes Cold" as an AllMusic reviewer's pick.

Music video
The song's music video premiered on August 27. Similar to the band's previous video, "Silence in the Snow," the video for "Until the World Goes Cold" is shot in black and white. The video features shots of the band performing inter-cut with footage of a man who finds the mask from Silence in the Snow's cover.

Charts

Personnel
Trivium
Matt Heafy – lead vocals, rhythm guitar
Corey Beaulieu – lead guitar
Paolo Gregoletto – bass, backing vocals
Mat Madiro – drums

References

External links
Official Music Video on YouTube

2015 singles
2015 songs
Song recordings produced by Michael Baskette
Songs written by Corey Beaulieu
Songs written by Matt Heafy
Songs written by Paolo Gregoletto
Trivium (band) songs